Jeremy Harkins is a former American soccer player who played in the USISL Premier League, USL A-League, and the Canadian Professional Soccer League.

Playing career 
Harkins began his career in 1996 with Detroit Dynamite of the USISL Premier League. During his two-year tenure he reached the playoffs in both seasons. In 1998, he signed with division rivals the Mid-Michigan Bucks, where he appeared in two matches and recorded one goal. In 1999, he signed with Cincinnati Riverhawks of the USL A-League. He featured in two matches for the Riverhawks. On January 25, 2004, he signed with newly formed Windsor Border Stars of the Canadian Professional Soccer League. In his debut season with Windsor he helped the club claim the Open Canada Cup. He also reached the playoffs with Windsor by finishing third in the Western Conference. In the playoffs Windsor faced Toronto Croatia. but were defeated by a score of 5–0. In 2005, he repeated his success with Windsor by defending their Open Canada Cup title. The club once more reached the postseason, but were defeated by Oakville Blue Devils.

References 

Living people
Flint City Bucks players
Cincinnati Riverhawks players
Windsor City FC players
USL League Two players
A-League (1995–2004) players
Canadian Soccer League (1998–present) players
American soccer players
Association football midfielders
Year of birth missing (living people)